Sovereign Currency Act of 2018 is a statute of the Legislature of the Marshall Islands which was passed on February 26, 2018. The Act creates and issues a digital decentralized currency (“cryptocurrency”) that will be used as a legal tender of the Republic of the Marshall Islands (RMI).

Sovereign Currency Act of 2018

The Sovereign Currency Act of 2018 creates and issues the Sovereign (SOV) its own cryptocurrency. This would lower the dependence on the USD. There are plans for a portion of the cryptocurrency's revenue to go towards radiation-related health care needs following nuclear tests from 1946 to 1958.

Implementation
The Sovereign  cryptocurrency was created through a partnership with Neema, a financial technology startup. Neema will use “Yokwe” protocol to ensure anonymity while also linking each account with a verified government identity that is both encrypted and private. The SOV will be issued by the Ministry of Finance and introduced through an initial coin offering (ICO) at a date yet to be announced. The number of SOV’s in circulation will start at 24 million and will grow by 4% each year. RMI President Hilda C. Heine called the creation of SOV “another step of manifesting our national liberty.”

Response

In September 2018, the International Monetary Fund (IMF) released a report warning the RMI not to launch its own cryptocurrency, the Sovereign, with primary concerns with cryptocurrency being a second form of legal tender, that the revenue from the ICO would be smaller than expected, and that proper governance on the cryptocurrency were not adequate.

See also 

 Petro (cryptocurrency)

References 

Economy of the Marshall Islands
Cryptocurrency projects
2018 in the Marshall Islands
2018 in economics